Ranil Dias (born 2 August 1957) is a Sri Lankan sailor. He competed in the 470 event at the 1984 Summer Olympics.

References

External links
 

1957 births
Living people
Sri Lankan male sailors (sport)
Olympic sailors of Sri Lanka
Sailors at the 1984 Summer Olympics – 470
Place of birth missing (living people)